Jason McCabe Calacanis (born November 28, 1970) is an American Internet entrepreneur, angel investor, author and podcaster.

His first company was part of the dot-com era in New York. His second venture, Weblogs, Inc., a publishing company that he co-founded together with Brian Alvey, capitalized on the growth of blogs before being sold to AOL. Calacanis is also an angel investor in various technology startups, and co-host of the All-In Podcast & This Week in Startups Podcast.

Early life 
Calacanis was born in the Bay Ridge section of Brooklyn, New York, to parents of Greek and Irish origin, and has two brothers.

He graduated from Xaverian High School in 1988. He then attended Fordham University, where he received a B.A. in psychology.

Career 
Calacanis started his career in the 1990s as a reporter covering the internet industry in New York.

Calacanis was founder and CEO of Rising Tide Studios, a media company that published print and online publications. During the dot-com boom, Calacanis was active in New York's Silicon Alley community, and in 1996 began producing the Silicon Alley Reporter. Originally a 16-page photocopied newsletter, it eventually expanded into a 300-page magazine, with a sister publication called the Digital Coast Reporter for the West Coast. Calacanis' socializing earned him a nickname as the "yearbook editor" of the Silicon Alley community. The company also organized conferences in New York, Los Angeles, and San Francisco focused on the Internet, web, and New Media. 

Calacanis co-founded the blog network Weblogs, Inc. with Brian Alvey on September 24, 2003, and the startup was supported by an angel investment from Mark Cuban.

Two years after inception, the Weblogs, Inc. blogs business was generating $1,000 a day just from AdSense. Time Warner's America Online agreed to buy Weblogs, Inc. in October 2005 for $25–30 million.

On November 16, 2006, TechCrunch reported that Calacanis had resigned from his position as CEO of Weblogs, Inc. and general manager of Netscape. Calacanis later confirmed this on his blog and the Gillmor Gang podcast.

Calacanis joined Sequoia Capital, a venture capital firm, as an EIA (entrepreneur in action) in December, 2006, a position which he held until May, 2007. Through this program, Calacanis invested $25K in Travis Kalanick's company, Uber. The deal is now worth about $100 million.

In 2007, Calacanis started an internet trend he called "fatblogging" after being fed up with being overweight. Fatblogging is when a person loses weight by exercising and then posting their weight afterwards onto their blog for encouragement and support from commenters and other fatbloggers.

He launched the web directory Mahalo ("thank you" in Hawaiian), which raised $20 million in venture capital from investors including Sequoia Capital, News Corp, CBS, Mark Cuban, and Elon Musk. The company hit a peak of 15 million unique visitors a month and achieved profitability in 2011, but suffered a sharp decline in traffic that year from the Google Panda search algorithm update and shut down in 2014.

Calacanis founded ThisWeekIn.com, which shut down in 2012 but is live again and available as a weekly podcast.

This Week in Startups (also called TWiSt) is a show hosted by Calacanis and co-hosted by Molly Wood.

He also founded a startup Inside.com which focuses on delivering thematic newsletters. The company raised $2.6 million.

In June 2019, Calacanis partnered with the NSW Government to create the Sydney Launch Festival for startups to give their pitches to global audiences.

Angel investing 
In 2009, Calacanis founded the Open Angel Forum, an event that connects early-stage startups with angel investors. The forum was the culmination of a series of public comments by Calacanis questioning the ethics of pay-to-pitch angel forums. Calacanis believes startups shouldn't have to pay to pitch angel investors, calling out fees that can range from $1,000 to $8,000 for a single 10- or 15-minute presentation. Calacanis is an angel investor in Robinhood, Wealthfront, Uber, Desktop Metal, Datastax, Thumbtack, Superhuman and Trello.

Calacanis raised a $10 million fund for his own venture investment firm to invest in startups that emerged from the Launch conference. Limited partners in the fund include David Sacks.
Following the success of the Launch conference, Calacanis declared his intent to get closer and more involved in the new ventures that emerged from that conference. The level of investment was around $25,000 to $100,000 in five to 10 startups per year.

Calacanis publicly announced in 2018 that he had sold all of his Facebook stock, expressing sharp criticism of company CEO and co-founder Mark Zuckerberg on the Too Embarrassed to Ask podcast. He called Zuckerberg "completely immoral" in how he runs the business and said, "No founder should ever sell a company to him."

Calacanis authored a book titled "Angel: How to Invest in Technology Startups—Timeless Advice from an Angel Investor Who Turned $100,000 into $100,000,000" on angel investing published by HarperCollins in 2017.

In 2018, Calacanis invested in Calm, a meditation app that is valued at $1 billion.

Podcasting

This Week in Startups 

This Week in Startups is a weekly podcast created and hosted by American internet entrepreneur and angel investor Jason Calacanis. The Wall Street Journal contributor Cecilie Rohwedder described the podcast as "an influential Web series filmed in the U.S."

History 
Plans for the podcast were announced on March 16, 2009, through a blog post. The 60-minute program premiered on May 1, 2009, featuring Brian Alvey, CEO and founder of the content management and hosting system Crowd Fusion, as its first guest. The show is one of the longest running podcasts on the topic of startups and angel investing.

Reception 
This Week in Startups was listed in an article at Fortune.com titled "The Ultimate Guide to the Best Business Podcasts".

All-In 
As of 2022, Calacanis is co-host of the All-In Podcast, alongside Chamath Palihapitiya, David O. Sacks, and David Friedberg. In May 2022, the All-In Podcast team hosted their first All-In Summit in Miami, where leaders in business and tech attended to discuss the central theme of "What problem do you want to solve right now?"

Personal life 
Calacanis married Jade Li sometime between 2006 and 2009. Calacanis' name was found in Jeffrey Epstein's little black book on page 9. On 5 August 2020, he addressed this discovery by stating that he met Epstein at a Ted Talk, when Epstein wanted to invest in Calacanis' magazine. Calacanis also added that he has "played ping pong with Ghislaine Maxwell once".

Politics 
Calacanis was an early supporter and founder for the effort behind the successful recall election of former San Francisco DA Chesa Boudin.

Publications 
 Jason Calacanis, Angel: How to Invest in Technology Startups, Harper Business, 2017

References 

 General

 Brown, Eryn (January 2006). "Revenge of the Dotcom Poster Boy". Wired; Conde Nast Digital. Retrieved 2010-06-19.

External links 
 This Week in Startups – podcast
 All In – podcast
 
 
 

1970 births
Living people
American bloggers
American computer businesspeople
Fordham University alumni
Angel investors
Weblogs, Inc.
People from Bay Ridge, Brooklyn
Xaverian High School alumni
American technology company founders
AOL employees
American technology chief executives